Eliza Nathanael (born 27 May 1973) is an Indonesian retired badminton player who specialized in doubles events.

Career 
A solid international level player throughout the 1990s, Nathanael had most of her early success in mixed doubles. She won titles at the China (1992), Hong Kong (1992), Thailand (1992), and French (1993) Opens with Aryono Miranat. They were bronze medalists at the 1993 IBF World Championships in Birmingham, England. Nathanael also won mixed doubles at the Southeast Asian Games in 1993 with Rudy Gunawan and in 1997 with Candra Wijaya.

In women's doubles Nathanael was competitive internationally with a variety of partners. She won the U.S. Open (1996), two Indonesia Opens (1996, 1997) and the Southeast Asian Games (1997) with Resiana Zelin. They were twice runners-up at the prestigious All-England Championships (1995, 1997), were quarter-finalists at the 1996 Summer Olympic Games in Atlanta, and earned bronze medals together at the 1997 IBF World Championships in Glasgow, Scotland. Nathanael won women's doubles at the 1996 Asian Championships with another Indonesian teammate, Finarsih, and her third consecutive Indonesia Open title, in 1998, with Deyana Lomban.

Nathanael was a member of several Indonesian Uber Cup (women's international) teams including two which won back to back world team championships in 1994 and 1996.

Achievements

World Championships 
Women's doubles

Mixed doubles

World Cup 
Women's doubles

Mixed doubles

Asian Games 
Women's doubles

Mixed doubles

Asian Championships 
Women's doubles

Asian Cup 
Mixed doubles

Southeast Asian Games 
Women's doubles

Mixed doubles

World Junior Championships 
The Bimantara World Junior Championships was an international invitation badminton tournament for junior players. It was held in Jakarta, Indonesia from 1987 to 1991.

Girls' doubles

IBF World Grand Prix 
The World Badminton Grand Prix was sanctioned by the International Badminton Federation from 1983 to 2006.

Women's doubles

Mixed doubles

 IBF Grand Prix tournament
 IBF Grand Prix Finals tournament

IBF International 
Women's doubles

References

External links 
 
 

1973 births
Living people
Sportspeople from Surabaya
Indonesian female badminton players
Badminton players at the 1996 Summer Olympics
Badminton players at the 2000 Summer Olympics
Olympic badminton players of Indonesia
Badminton players at the 1994 Asian Games
Badminton players at the 1998 Asian Games
Asian Games silver medalists for Indonesia
Asian Games bronze medalists for Indonesia
Asian Games medalists in badminton
Medalists at the 1994 Asian Games
Medalists at the 1998 Asian Games
Competitors at the 1993 Southeast Asian Games
Competitors at the 1995 Southeast Asian Games
Competitors at the 1997 Southeast Asian Games
Southeast Asian Games gold medalists for Indonesia
Southeast Asian Games silver medalists for Indonesia
Southeast Asian Games medalists in badminton
20th-century Indonesian women
21st-century Indonesian women